The Foundation for Child Development is a United States-based non-profit organization which promotes good child development.

History and name
The organization began as a volunteer community project in 1899, then in 1908 was established as the Association for the Aid of Crippled Children. The goal of the organization then was to support disabled children. In 1972 the organization changed its name to the Foundation for Child Development.

Research

References

External links

Archives of the Foundation for Child Development, 1909-1996, held by the Rockefeller Archive Center

1899 establishments in New York City
Children's charities based in the United States
Non-profit organizations based in New York City
Medical and health foundations in the United States
Child development organizations